Arctia thibetica is a species of tiger moth in the family Erebidae, found in the northwestern Himalayas of India.

References

Arctiina